Aleksei Budõlin (born 5 April 1976) is an Estonian judoka. At the 2000 Summer Olympics he won the bronze medal in the men's Half Middleweight (73–81 kg) category, together with Nuno Delgado of Portugal.

References

External links

 
 
 Videos of Alexei Budolin in action (judovision.org)

1976 births
Living people
Estonian male judoka
Estonian sambo practitioners
Judoka at the 2000 Summer Olympics
Olympic judoka of Estonia
Olympic bronze medalists for Estonia
Olympic medalists in judo
Sportspeople from Tallinn
Estonian people of Russian descent
Medalists at the 2000 Summer Olympics
Judoka at the 2004 Summer Olympics
20th-century Estonian people
21st-century Estonian people